Elections were held in the Regional Municipality of Durham in Ontario, on October 22, 2018 in conjunction with municipal elections across the province.

Durham Regional Council

Durham Regional Chair
The following are the preliminary results for the position of Durham Regional Chair.

Ajax
The following are the preliminary results for the Town of Ajax.

Following a ward boundary review, Ajax gained one regional councillor and lost one local councillor for the 2018 election. The overall size of the council remained the same.

Mayor

Regional Councillors
Three Regional Councillors were elected in 1 of 3 wards.

Local Councillors
Three Local Councillors were elected in 1 of 3 wards.

Brock
The following are the preliminary results for the Township of Brock.

Mayor

Regional Councillor
One Regional Councillor was elected.

Local Councillors
Five Local Councillors were elected in 1 of 5 wards.

Clarington
The following are the preliminary results for the Municipality of Clarington.

Mayor

Regional Councillors
Two Regional Councillors were elected in 1 of 2 wards.

Local Councillors
Four Local Councillors were elected in 1 of 4 wards.

Oshawa

The following are the preliminary results for the City of Oshawa.

For the 2018 election, Oshawa re-adopted a ward based system. Voters in each ward elected one regional councillor and one city councillor.

Mayor

Regional & City Councillors

Five Regional & City Councillors were elected in 1 of 5 wards.

City Councillors
Five City Councillors were elected in 1 of 5 wards.

Pickering
The following are the preliminary results for the City of Pickering.

Mayor

Regional Councillors
Three Regional Councillors were elected in 1 of 3 wards.

City Councillors
Three City Councillors were elected in 1 of 3 wards.

Scugog
The following are the preliminary results for the Township of Scugog.

Mayor

Regional Councillor
One Regional Councillor was elected.

Local Councillors
Five Local Councillors were elected in 1 of 5 wards.

Uxbridge
The following are the preliminary results for the Town of Uxbridge.

Mayor

Regional Councillor
One Regional Councillor was elected.

Local Councillors
Five Local Councillors were elected in 1 of 5 wards.

Whitby
The following are the preliminary results for the Town of Whitby.

Mayor

Regional Councillors
Four Regional Councillors were elected.

Local Councillors
Four Local Councillors were elected in 1 of 4 wards.

References 

Durham
Politics of the Regional Municipality of Durham